KORY-CD, virtual and UHF digital channel 15, is a low-powered, Class A MiCasa-affiliated television station licensed to Eugene, Oregon, United States. The station is owned by HC2 Holdings.

External links

Low-power television stations in the United States
ORY-CD
1995 establishments in Oregon
Television channels and stations established in 1995